The Attacks of 26/11 is a 2013 Indian Hindi-language action thriller film directed by Ram Gopal Varma, based on the book Kasab: The Face of 26/11 by Rommel Rodrigues about Ajmal Kasab perpetrator of the 2008 Mumbai attacks. The film stars Sanjeev Jaiswal in his film debut, playing the role of terrorist Ajmal Kasab, with art direction by Uday Singh. It also features Nana Patekar in a pivotal role. A seven-minute promo of the film was released over the Internet on 23 November 2012.

The first look of the film was revealed on 17 January 2013. The Central Board of Film Certification (CBFC) passed the film, uncut, with an 'Adults Only' certificate. The film was premiered at the Berlin International Film Festival, in the Panorama as well as the Competition section. The film had a theatrical release on 1 March 2013, to positive reviews, and was opened to critical acclaim at the Films Division of India.

Background 
On December 30, 2008, Ram Gopal Varma toured the ravaged Taj Mahal Palace Hotel just days after the attacks, drawing widespread condemnation. At the time, Varma called his visit a 'coincidence' and said he had no plans of making a film based on the attacks, but later apologised for his visit prior to the release of the film.

Cast 
 Nana Patekar as Rakesh Maria
 Rahaao as Abu Ismail Khan
 Sanjeev Jaiswal as Mohammed Ajmal Amir Kasab, the Main Antagonist
 Atul Gavandi as Abu Umer
 Ashish Bhatt as Shoaib
 Sukesh Mishra as Fahadullah
 Vishal Khosla as Abdul Rehman
 Mak Mukesh Tripathi as Babar Imran
 Atul Kulkarni as Inspector Shinde
 Shahab Khan as Inspector at Cama Hospital
 Jitendra Joshi as constable
 Ganesh Yadav as Amar Singh Solanki, captain of fishing trawler MV Kuber
 Farzad Jehani as himself, owner of Leopold Cafe
 Jasbir Thandi as Hemant Karkare.        
 Satwinder singh as Abu Ali ( Javed)

Production 
Under the art direction of Uday Singh a replica of Taj Hotel was created with a cost of 40 million. Varma auditioned 500 applicants and selected Sanjeev Jaiswal to play Ajmal Kasab, the prime accused terrorist in the 26/11 attack on Mumbai. Varma had also asked policemen to watch 15-minute trailer of The Attacks of 26/11. The film is restricted to the night of the incident and has focused on the happenings between 9 p.m. to 1 a.m. when Kasab was caught. The shooting of the film completed on 10 December 2012 with last shot of the massacre at Chhatrapati Shivaji Terminus railway station. The owner of Leopold Cafe plays himself in the film. The actors in the film have met the victims and research on the subject including the eyewitnesses, police statements, judgment, charge sheets and author Romil Saxena.

Locations 
The film was shot on real locations.

Marketing 
The film's first 7 minutes were released on 23 November 2012, online on YouTube through the channel of Eros International. A special screening of the film was arranged by the director for Karan Johar and Rakesh Maria. The first trailer of Satya 2 was attached with the film.

Reception 

Subhash K. Jha of the Deccan Herald gave the film 4 out of 5 stars, calling the movie "a work of riveting resonance" and "one of the best films in recent times on the wages of terrorism". Resham Sengar of Zee News called the film "a moving sketch of the dreadful terror attack", and gave the film 4 stars out of 5. Taran Adarsh of Bollywood Hungama gave it 3.5 out of 5 and said that the film was "A powerful retelling of a regrettable event in history".

Vaihayasi Pande Daniel of Rediff.com gave it two and half stars, saying "I have a headache. My ears are still ringing. The nausea is just about abating." Madhureeta Mukherjee of The Times of India said "While the thought is poignant, the horror isn't palpable throughout and the execution doesn't cut as deep as the actual tragedy." and gave it two and half stars. Saibal Chatterjee of NDTV gave 2.5 stars calling the movie "watchable" and saying "Ram Gopal Varma is still not back to his best and The Attacks of 26/11 isn't an unqualified triumph."

In his review for News18, Rajeev Masand gave the film 1.5 stars, writing that the film "often resembles a tacky B-movie" and was a "tragedy exploited". In Anupama Chopra's review for the Hindustan Times, the film received 2.5 stars, with the author remarking that the movie's "powerful subject [is] watered down by ineffective story-telling".

Nana Patekar's acting as Rakesh Maria was appreciated. Firstpost wrote in their review— "Nana holds the film together. He feels every line that he utters. His heart bleeds for each one of the 166 people who died on that night. When he tells Kasab in a choked voice, "I have a son of your age", Nana isn't faking it. His performance goes way beyond acting."

Soundtrack 
The first song from The Attacks of 26/11 was released at the Leopold Cafe on 11 February 2013 at exactly the time when the terror attacks began on the cafe and Mumbai city. There are total 4 songs in the album. Ram Gopal Varma sung the song "Nethutti Ruchi Mariginda" in the Telugu version of this film.

Soundtrack reception 
Joginder Tuteja of Bollywood Hungama gave it 2 out of 5 and stated that except "Maula Maula" the rest songs are average to hear and may just enhance the film's narrative to some extent.

See also 
 Hotel Mumbai

References

External links 
 

2013 films
2010s avant-garde and experimental films
2013 crime action films
2013 crime thriller films
2013 action thriller films
Action films based on actual events
Films about jihadism
Films about organised crime in India
Films based on the 2008 Mumbai attacks
Films directed by Ram Gopal Varma
Films shot in Mumbai
Indian action thriller films
Indian avant-garde and experimental films
Films about terrorism in India
Indian crime action films
Indian crime thriller films
Indian films based on actual events
Thriller films based on actual events
2010s biographical films
Islamic terrorism in fiction
Films based on non-fiction books
Hindi-language films based on actual events